The pre-election period (formerly known as Purdah) is the period in the United Kingdom between the announcement of an election and the formation of the new elected government. It affects civil servants, who must be politically impartial, preventing central and local government from making announcements about any new or controversial government initiatives that could be seen to be advantageous to any candidates or parties in the forthcoming election. The pre-election period does not apply to candidates for political office. Where a court determines that actual advantage has been given to a candidate, this may amount to a breach of Section 2 of the Local Government Act 1986.

Etymology 
Purdah, which comes from the Hindustani word ( or) means curtain or veil. It refers specifically to the segregation of the sexes and the requirement for women to cover their bodies.

The use of purdah to refer to the period between the announcement of an election and the formation of a new elected body has fallen out of use in the UK following criticism of its sexist origins. The preferred terms are 'pre-election period' or 'heightened sensitivity' to refer to the period of electioneering.

Practice and legal status 
The pre election period typically begins six weeks before the scheduled election, in each authority on the day the notice of election is published; for the 2017 elections to Combined Authority Mayors, purdah began on 23 March. For the 8 June 2017 United Kingdom general election, the pre election period began on 22 April, and for the 12 December 2019 United Kingdom general election, the pre-election period commenced on 6 November.

The pre-election period has been imposed in ministerial guidance since at least the early 20th century reflecting an earlier "self-denying ordinance", and has considerable moral authority, its breach carrying with it in worst cases the possibility of actions for abuse of power and misconduct in public office. Otherwise its lack of statute or common law means different local authorities adopt different standards as to the extent to which they observe the convention, and executives are always mindful of the possibility of decisions being open to judicial review on the grounds of legitimate expectations, breach of natural justice, or procedural impropriety if the pre-election period is breached.  Where observed by executive officers, the pre-election period bars entering into any transactions or carrying out any works which would clearly or directly conflict with the stated intentional commitments (manifesto) of the cabinet or shadow cabinet in any authority. When local elections are being held at the same time as a general election, this higher standard is usually applied.

At the national level, major decisions on policy are postponed until after the pre-election period, unless it is in the national interest to proceed, or a delay would waste public money. The Cabinet Office issues guidance before each election to civil servants, including those in the devolved national parliaments and assemblies. The pre-election period also continues after the election during the time in which new MPs and ministers are sworn in. In the event of an inconclusive election result, purdah does not end until a new government forms. When no party has an overall majority, it may take some time before a minority or coalition government is formed.

Section 2 of the Local Government Act 1986 prohibits the publication by local authorities of material which, in whole or in part, appears to be designed to affect public support for a political party.

Local government 
For local elections in England and Wales, the activities of local authorities in the pre-election period are governed by the Recommended code of practice for local authority publicity, Circular 01/2011, issued as part of the provisions of the Local Government Act 1986. Section 39 of the Local Audit and Accountability Act 2014 inserted sections 4A and 4B into the Local Government Act 1986 which provide powers for the Secretary of State to issue a notice to comply or explain, followed after non-compliance, by a direction; and to issue a more general Order if approved by Parliament across multiple authorities to comply in some respects with provisions of the recommendatory, good practice, code.  The code mentions at the outset that it in no way detracts from the section 2 offence of the Act.

A pre election period in local government ends on the close of polls which, for ordinary elections, is usually on the first Thursday in May.

National Health Service
Although NHS staff are not generally regarded as civil servants, pre-election periods are increasingly enforced on NHS bodies.  In 2017 it was decided that the financial result of the NHS provider sector, normally published in May each year, should be postponed until after the General Election. This was controversial, and was seen by many as an attempt by the government of the day to gag NHS bodies from publishing information it saw as a threat to its general election campaign.

See also 

 Budget purdah
 Caretaker government of Australia – similar concept in Australian parliamentary system
 Election Commission of India's Model Code of Conduct

References

External links

UK Government – Election guidance for civil servants

Caretaker governments
Elections in New Zealand
Elections in the United Kingdom